The fourth series of RuPaul's Drag Race UK began airing on BBC Three on 22 September 2022. RuPaul returned to his role as main host and head judge, and was again joined on the judging panel by Michelle Visage, Alan Carr and Graham Norton, all of whom returned for their respective fourth series. The series was filmed in Manchester in February 2022. The cast for the fourth series was revealed on 7 September 2022 on social media. The cast also featured Dakota Schiffer, the first out trans woman to compete in the British version of the show.

The winner of the fourth series of RuPaul's Drag Race UK was Danny Beard, with Cheddar Gorgeous as the runner-up.

Production
On 27 October 2021, it was announced via the shows official Instagram page, that casting for the fourth series was now open. Applications remained open for two weeks until closing on 10 November 2021. Hannah Waddingham revealed herself to be first celebrity guest judge during an interview on Jimmy Kimmel Live, hosted by RuPaul. The fourth series will be the first regular series of the show to be broadcast on BBC Three following RuPaul's Drag Race: UK vs the World earlier in the year, with the show's success being credited in the decision to bring back the previously defunct television channel. On 30 August 2022, a ten-second teaser was released by the BBC to promote the series premiere with the caption "Bring it to the RUNW4Y". The BBC released the list of celebrity guest judges the following day.

Judge Graham Norton revealed in an interview with Gay Times that the competitors that appeared on the fourth series were "some of the best queens we've ever seen". Norton said because the series was a post-COVID-19 season, the queens had a lot more freedom and that it was, "very hard for the [season three] queens in COVID because they weren't making any money and lots of the dressmakers had stopped working. I think it was really hard during COVID, so this is definitely a post-COVID season and it's great. You can look forward to it. You don't need to worry!" It was revealed that executives had recruited former The Jeremy Kyle Show bodyguard known as "Big Steve", to work on the show. On 1 September 2022, the BBC announced the series would premiere on 22 September, to coincide with the conclusion of the third season of Canada's Drag Race and the second season of RuPaul's Drag Race Down Under.

In September 2022, the BBC reported that Series 2 contestant, Cherry Valentine, had died at the age of 28. Subsequently, the second episode from Series 4 was dedicated to Cherry Valentine in their memory on 29 September 2022. RuPaul missed filming during Episode 7, therefore Visage took over as main judge and host, whilst Raven took Visage's spot on the judging panel. It subsequently made it the first episode RuPaul has missed from across all Drag Race franchises hosted by RuPaul himself. Coincidentally, it made Raven the first former Drag Race contestant to judge on a RuPaul fronted franchise.

Contestants

Ages, names, and cities stated are at time of filming.

Notes:

Contestant progress

Lip syncs
Legend:

Guest judges
Listed in chronological order:

Dame Joanna Lumley, actress
FKA Twigs, singer and actress
Leomie Anderson, model
Alison Hammond, television presenter
Hannah Waddingham, actress and singer
Mel B, singer
Boy George, singer
Raven, drag queen and make-up artist
Lorraine Pascale, chef
Olly Alexander, singer and actor

Special guests
Guests who will appear in episodes, but not judge on the main stage.

Episode 1
Guy Levy, photographer

Episode 2
Cathy Dennis, singer and songwriter
Leland, producer
Freddy Scott, producer and songwriter

Episode 5
Dane Chalfin, vocal coach
Giovanni Pernice, dancer and choreographer

Episode 6
Baga Chipz, contestant on RuPaul's Drag Race UK Series 1 and UK vs the World
Tess Daly, television presenter
AJ Odudu, television presenter

Episode 9
Aisling Bea, comedian

Episode 10
Claudimar Neto, dancer and choreographer
The Vivienne, winner of RuPaul's Drag Race UK Series 1
Lawrence Chaney, winner of RuPaul's Drag Race UK Series 2
Krystal Versace, winner of RuPaul's Drag Race UK Series 3

Episodes

References

2022 British television seasons
2022 in LGBT history
RuPaul's Drag Race UK seasons